Furnace Pond is a  pond in Pembroke, Massachusetts. The pond is located southeast of Oldham Pond which is connected to Furnace Pond by an inlet, and east of Great Sandy Bottom Pond. The maximum depth is nine feet. The pond is a Class A Public Water Source for the Brockton Water Commission. Water from this pond is diverted into Silver Lake through Tubbs Meadow Brook, the pond's outflow, whenever there is a water shortage there. The Furnace Pond Neighborhood Association maintains a semi-public beach along the pond.

External links
South Shore Coastal Watersheds - Lake Assessments
Environmental Protection Agency
MassWildlife – Pond Map and Info
Pembroke Watershed Association 

Ponds of Plymouth County, Massachusetts
Pembroke, Massachusetts
Ponds of Massachusetts